Michael Horowitz may refer to:

Michael C. Horowitz (born 1978), American writer and political scientist
Michael D. Horowitz (born 1938), American author and archivist
Michael E. Horowitz, born 1962), Inspector General at the U.S. Department of Justice
Michael J. Horowitz (born 1964), American electrical engineer

See also
Mikhail Horowitz (born 1950), American poet and satirist
Michael Horovitz (1935–2021), British poet